The American Music Award for Favorite Female Artist – Country has been awarded since 1974. Years reflect the year in which the awards were presented, for works released in the previous year (until 2003 onward when awards were handed out on November of the same year). The all-time winner in this category is Reba McEntire with 11 wins stretching across three decades. McEntire was also the first woman to win the award eight years in a row.

Winners and nominees

1970s

1980s

1990s

2000s

2010s

2020s

Category facts

Multiple wins

 11 wins
 Reba McEntire

 8 wins
 Carrie Underwood

 7 wins
 Taylor Swift

 5 wins
 Barbara Mandrell

 4 wins
 Faith Hill

 3 wins
 Crystal Gayle
 Shania Twain

 2 wins
 Loretta Lynn
 Olivia Newton-John

Most consecutive wins

 8 wins
 Reba McEntire
 6 wins
 Taylor Swift
 Carrie Underwood

 3 wins
 Barbara Mandrell

Multiple nominations

 15 nominations
 Reba McEntire
 Carrie Underwood

 10 nominations
 Miranda Lambert

 9 nominations
 Dolly Parton

 8 nominations
 Taylor Swift

 7 nominations
 Faith Hill
 Barbara Mandrell
 Martina McBride

 6 nominations
 Crystal Gayle
 Loretta Lynn
 Shania Twain

 5 nominations
 Maren Morris
 Tanya Tucker

 4 nominations
 Kelsea Ballerini
 Anne Murray

 3 nominations
 Mary Chapin Carpenter
 Wynonna Judd
 Lorrie Morgan
 LeAnn Rimes
 Gretchen Wilson

 2 nominations
 Gabby Barrett
 Rosanne Cash
 Sara Evans
 Emmylou Harris
 Kathy Mattea
 Jo Dee Messina
 Kacey Musgraves
 Olivia Newton-John
 K. T. Oslin
 Linda Ronstadt
 Sylvia

See also

 List of music awards honoring women

References

American Music Awards
Country music awards
Music awards honoring women
Awards established in 1974
1974 establishments in the United States